Francisco Borgia may refer to following members of the Borgia family:
Francis Borgia, 4th Duke of Gandía, a Spanish nobleman and catholic saint
Francisco de Borja, a Spanish cardinal
Francisco de Borja y Aragón, a Spanish writer and official
Francisco Antonio de Borja-Centelles y Ponce de Léon, a Spanish cardinal
Francisco Galcerán de Lloris y de Borja, an unconsecrated Spanish cardinal